Ahmedabad Civil Hospital is a public hospital located in Ahmedabad, India, with facilities for specialised diagnostic, therapeutic and rehabilitative patient care. The hospital campus spans  of land and houses the Gujarat Medical Council and Gujarat Nursing Council. It is affiliated to B.J. Medical College in Ahmedabad.It is the largest hospital in Asia with most specialities under one roof .

History 
The hospital traces its origins to 1858, when it was founded with the help of donations given by Shri Hutheesing, Shri Premabhai and Surgeon General D Wyllie, for a total cost of 96,000. It had rooms for 92 inpatients. Every year, the hospital admits around 70,000 patients, conducts 26,000 surgeries, and performs 6,500 deliveries.

Working 
In 2019, the hospital inaugurated a new 1,200-bed building within the campus, built at a cost of Rs 395 crore. Earlier that month, hundreds of contractual employees of the hospital protested the incomplete payment of salaries.

COVID-19 pandemic in Gujarat
During the COVID-19 pandemic, the Gujarat High Court highlighted the poor health infrastructure of the hospital, calling conditions in the hospital "pathetic" and "as good as a dungeon", highlighting the lack of ventilators and lack of accountability by senior physicians. After a few days, a new bench of the High Court noted that "administration has geared up and is doing quite well" after observing that the hospital had additional healthcare staff along with 47 ventilators.

References

Hospital buildings completed in 1953
Hospitals in Ahmedabad
Hospitals established in 1953
Healthcare in Ahmedabad
1858 establishments in India
20th-century architecture in India